The Palestine Herald-Press is a daily newspaper published in Palestine, Texas, distributed in Tuesday through Friday mornings and a Weekend edition delivered on Saturday mornings. It is owned by CNHI.

Founded in 1849 as the Palestine Advocate, the Palestine Daily Herald came about following the Hamilton family's 1903 merger of the Advocate with the Palestine Press and Palestine Daily Visitor. The name "Press" was added under the Patrick family's ownership in 1966. That family sold the paper in 1998 to Alabama-based CNHI, which owns it today.

Editor Jeffery Gerritt won the 2020  Pulitzer Prize for Editorial Writing.

References

External links
 Herald-Press Website
 CNHI Website

Palestine Herald-Press
Palestine Herald-Press
Palestine, Texas
1849 establishments in Texas
Publications established in 1849
Pulitzer Prize-winning newspapers